Gene Tober is a former U.S. soccer player who earned three caps with the United States.

Tober’s first game with the national team was in a 4-0 loss to Israel on September 25, 1968 when he came on for Adolph Bachmeier.  His second game was a 5-2 loss to Haiti on October 21.  His last was a 1-0 loss to Haiti two days later.

References

United States men's international soccer players
Living people
American soccer players
Association footballers not categorized by position
Year of birth missing (living people)